The National Party of 1848, or the Party of 1848 (Far-Left until 1870) was a Hungarian political party, whose members were mainly Lajos Kossuth's former supporters and those who opposed the Austro-Hungarian Compromise of 1867. Its members were mostly middle-class citizens and peasants. For a long time he worked as a faction of the Resolution Party and then of the Left Centre under the name of Szélsőbal.

The party participated the elections of 1861 and 1865 before becoming permanently independent in April 1868.

Sources 

Defunct political parties in Hungary
Political parties disestablished in 1874
Political parties in Austria-Hungary
Radical parties